Humaira Himu (Known as: Himu) is a Bangladeshi television and film actress. She made her film debut in Amar Bondhu Rashed in 2011. She has appeared in TV dramas like DB, Sanghat, Chairman Bari, Batighor, and Shonena She Shonena.

TV shows

Filmography 
 Amar Bondhu Rashed (2011) as Aru Apa

References

Bangladeshi film actresses
Bangladeshi actresses
Bangladeshi television actresses
Living people
Year of birth missing (living people)